Heliamphora chimantensis is a species of marsh pitcher plant endemic to the Chimantá Massif in Venezuela. Specifically, it has been recorded from Apacará and Chimantá Tepuis. It is thought to be more closely related to the southern growing H. tatei and H. neblinae than to any of the other species found in the Gran Sabana and its tepuis. All other species known from this region have between 10 and 15 anthers, while H. tatei, H. neblinae and H. chimantensis have around 20. However, the anthers of H. tatei and the closely related H. neblinae (once thought to be a variety of the former) are 7–9 mm long, while those of H. chimantensis only reach 5 mm in length.

References

Further reading

  Fleischmann, A. & J.R. Grande Allende (2012) ['2011']. Taxonomía de Heliamphora minor Gleason (Sarraceniaceae) del Auyán-tepui, incluyendo una nueva variedad. [Taxonomy of Heliamphora minor Gleason (Sarraceniaceae) from Auyán-tepui, including a new variety.] Acta Botánica Venezuelica 34(1): 1–11.
 McPherson, S. (2007). Pitcher Plants of the Americas. The McDonald & Woodward Publishing Company, Blacksburg, Virginia. 
 Nerz, J. (December 2004). Heliamphora elongata (Sarraceniaceae), a new species from Ilu-Tepui. Carnivorous Plant Newsletter 33(4): 111–116.
 Nerz, J. & A. Wistuba (June 2006). Heliamphora exappendiculata, a clearly distinct species with unique characteristics. Carnivorous Plant Newsletter 35(2): 43–51.
  Wistuba, A., T. Carow, P. Harbarth, & J. Nerz (2005). Heliamphora pulchella, eine neue mit Heliamphora minor (Sarraceniaceae) verwandte Art aus der Chimanta Region in Venezuela. Das Taublatt 53(3): 42–50.

chimantensis
Flora of Venezuela
Tepui
Carnivorous plants
Plants described in 2002
Flora of the Tepuis